Mount Vesalius is a mountain (765 m) standing northwest of Macleod Point, Liege Island, in the Palmer Archipelago. It surmounts Pleystor Glacier to the northwest.

The peak was shown on an Argentine government chart of 1950, but was named by the United Kingdom Antarctic Place-Names Committee (UK-APC) in 1960 for Vesalius (1514–1564), a Flemish anatomist who wrote a pioneer work on the structure of the human body which revolutionized the whole concept of the subject.

External links 

 Mount Vesalius on USGS website
 Mount Vesalius on AADC website
 Mount Vesalius on SCAR website
 Mount Vesalius Copernix satellite image

References 

Mountains of the Palmer Archipelago
Liège Island